The Zhiguli Mountains or simply Zhiguli, are a range of wooded mountains located in Russia on the right bank of the Volga River, inside the Samara bend. The mountains are an important source of limestone and oil (extracted since World War II) and are also popular as a scenic area for local and regional tourism. Their altitude reaches a maximum of c. 1,240 ft (380 m). The range is named for a nearby town Zhigulyovka (no longer extant), itself probably named for an early inhabitant, Zhegul. Formerly, the range was known as the Lada, after the river pirates who used to hide out in its wooded valleys, a name which is still in popular local usage today.

Geography and geology
The range's topography is skewed from north to south: the northern slopes drop very abruptly down to the Volga River, while to the south the hills descend much more gently, forming a wide plateau dissected by a labyrinth of narrow valleys and gullies. The western part of Zhiguli is separated from the main plateau by the broad inlet of the Usa river. The central, highest part of the Zhiguli is an almost flat plateau, which also forms the highest point in the entire central zone of European Russia.

The Zhiguli are considered the only tectonically active mountains in European Russia, first having formed around 7 million years ago. The summits and other exposed areas of the Zhiguli are composed of limestone and dolomite sediments laid down 230–350 million years ago in the Permian and Carboniferous periods. The slopes of Zhiguli are mostly formed from products of aeration of the Permian and Carboniferous bedrock.

See also
Zhigulyovsk
Zhiguli Hydroelectric Station
Zhiguli (car brand)

References

External links

Encyclopedia.com

Mountain ranges of Russia
Oil fields of Russia
Landforms of Samara Oblast
Oil fields of the Soviet Union